Central Coast Mariners Football Club is an Australian professional soccer club based in Gosford, on the Central Coast of New South Wales. It competes in the A-League Men, under licence from the Australian Professional Leagues (APL). The Mariners were founded in 2004 and are one of the eight original A-League teams. It is the first professional sports club from the Gosford region to compete in a national competition. Despite being considered one of the smallest-market clubs in the league, the Central Coast Mariners have claimed one A-League Championship from four Grand Final appearances and topped the table to win the A-League Premiership twice. The club has also appeared in the AFC Champions League five times.

The club plays matches at Central Coast Stadium, a 20,059-seat stadium in Gosford; its purpose-built training facility, Mariners Centre of Excellence, is located in the suburb of Tuggerah. The facility is also home to a youth team that competes in the A-League Youth.

The Mariners' main supporters' group is known as the Yellow Army, for the colour of the club's home kit. The club shares a rivalry with Newcastle Jets, known as the F3 Derby, after the previous name of the highway that connects the cities of the teams. Matt Simon is the Mariners' all-time leading goalscorer as of May 2022, with 66 goals in all competitions. The team record for matches played is held by John Hutchinson, who has appeared in 263 games for the Mariners.

History

Formation (2004)
Central Coast Mariners' bid for a franchise in the Football Federation Australia's new A-League competition was aimed at filling the one spot for a regional team that was designated by the FFA. Media speculation prior to the announcement of the franchises in the new league suggested that the Mariners' bid may be favourable due to its new blood. Backing from former Australian international player and club technical director Alex Tobin, as well as Clean Up Australia personality Ian Kiernan—who would act as inaugural club chairman—also strengthened its proposal. As the only regional bidder, Central Coast was expected to make it into the league by default. Following a reported signed deal with the FFA, the club signed former Northern Spirit coach Lawrie McKinna as manager and Ian Ferguson, a former Rangers and Northern Spirit player, as coach. To aid the FFA's goals of building the profile of the sport, the Mariners created formal links with local state league team Central Coast United. On 1 November 2004, after much expectation, the club was announced as one of eight teams to become part of FFA's domestic competition, the A-League. The decision made Central Coast Mariners the first Gosford-based professional sports team to play in a national competition.

At the time of the formation of the new league in 2004, the club was owned by Spirits Sports and Leisure Group. The club announced its search for a star player under the league's allowance for one star player outside of the $1.5 million salary cap, insisting that the player should not look at the position as a retirement fund. Coach Lawrie McKinna sought interest from Australia national football team players Ante Milicic and Simon Colosimo, and announced that he may sign more than the three under-20 players required by league rules. Early concerns for the club focussed on concerns over financial stability, but after forming a partnership with technology company Toshiba and a cash injection from local businessman John Singleton, the club's financial worries were eased. McKinna was keen to sign local player Damien Brown of Bateau Bay, formerly of the Newcastle Jets. In a decision which prompted the player to declare that he was "over the moon", Brown became the first player to sign with the club. Club chairman Lyall Gorman was pleased that a local had become a "foundation player" and part of Brown's role would be to assist with selection of younger players from the local area. By early December 2004, the club had created a steady foundation of player signings and began negotiations with former Perth Glory striker Nik Mrdja, signing him later in the month as its star attacker. Mrjda was one of the most prominent players in the last season of the National Soccer League, scoring the final goal to secure Perth Glory's finals win. The club's management was reluctant to sign a star player outside of the $1.5 million salary cap, stipulating that they "would have to contribute on the pitch and get people to come to the ground."

Lawrie McKinna era (2004–2010)

The Mariners' inaugural season was considered a resounding success by most; the team reached the 2006 A-League Grand Final after finishing third during the regular season. Central Coast was defeated by Sydney FC 1–0 in front of a crowd of 41,689—a competition record at the time. The Mariners also won the 2005 Pre-Season Cup, defeating Perth Glory in the final 1–0. Before the 2006–07 A-League season, the Mariners secured the services of then-Australian international Tony Vidmar from NAC Breda for two years. This was the club's first marquee signing, following the lead of Sydney FC (Dwight Yorke) and Adelaide United (Qu Shengqing). Central Coast again reached the grand final in the 2006 Pre-Season Cup, losing to Adelaide United 5–4 on penalties after the score was tied 1–1 after extra time. The Mariners then participated in the 2006–07 A-League season, but was unable to gain a spot in the final series, finishing sixth after the regular season.

Club captain Noel Spencer was released by the Mariners, then signed to participate in the Asian Champions League by Sydney FC after the 2006–07 season, and Alex Wilkinson was appointed the new captain. Only 22 years of age at the time, Wilkinson had played every possible competitive match for the Mariners up to his appointment. In February 2008, Central Coast Mariners signed an arrangement with English Football League Championship side Sheffield United. The partnership was one of several connections the Mariners made with foreign clubs; other partner clubs included Ferencváros of Hungary, Chengdu Blades of China and São Paulo of Brazil. The agreement benefits the club by providing an opportunity for the youth programme and senior side to draw from the roster of Sheffield United through transfers. The teams also formed a property development joint venture, in the hopes that Central Coast could use its share of income to expand and bolster their Mariners Youth Academy.

The 2007–08 season saw Central Coast win its first premiership on goal difference ahead of Newcastle, following a final round that began with Central Coast and three other clubs level on 31 points. The final series began with a 2–0 loss to Newcastle in the first leg of its major semi-final, but the Mariners forced the tie to extra time by holding a 2–0 lead in the second leg after 90 minutes. A 94th-minute goal by Sasho Petrovski, who had scored earlier to level the tie, gave Central Coast a 3–2 win on aggregate, putting the Mariners through to the 2008 A-League Grand Final. In a rematch with Newcastle, the Jets defeated Central Coast 1–0 in the Grand Final, which ended in controversy due to an uncalled handball against Newcastle in Central Coast Mariners penalty box during the closing seconds of the match. If called, the foul would have given Central Coast a penalty kick and a chance to equalise. As Mariners players disputed referee Mark Shield's decision, goalkeeper Danny Vuković struck Shield on the arm, resulting in an immediate sending off and later suspension. Vuković was suspended from both domestic and international competition for nine months, with an additional six-months' suspended ban; the latter period was reduced to three months on appeal. Despite further appeals, the ban was eventually confirmed by FIFA in June, to include banning the young keeper from competing at the 2008 Olympic Games. The ban lasted into October; in response, Central Coast signed former Manchester United and Australian international keeper Mark Bosnich on a seven-week contract.

Before the 2008–09 season, Central Coast was predicted to be among the A-League leaders, but had a run of three losses in a row to end the regular season. Even with the losing streak, the club narrowly qualified for the finals, finishing in fourth, two points ahead of Sydney F.C. and Wellington Phoenix. Central Coast lost 4–1 on aggregate in their minor semi-final against Queensland Roar, ending the team's season.

Graham Arnold and Phil Moss era (2010–2015)
In February 2010, following the club's 2009–10 season, McKinna chose to move into a new role, becoming Central Coast's Football and Commercial Operations Manager. Socceroos assistant manager Graham Arnold was appointed as the club's new manager, becoming its second manager. In the lead-up to the 2010–11 season, numerous transfers resulted in changes to the club's squad. The Mariners announced the signing of 2005 Under 20s World Cup winner Patricio Pérez of Argentina in June 2010, followed by Dutch defender Patrick Zwaanswijk. In July 2010, it was announced that the Mariners' women's team would not compete in the 2010–11 W-League competition. The club stated that financial reasons were behind the decision, after Football NSW withdrew its funding.

In spite of relatively low expectations in the lead up to the season, the 2010–11 season was more successful for the club than 2009–10; the A-League and youth league teams both finished second in their respective leagues in the regular season. The senior team was then defeated by the premiers, Brisbane Roar, 4–2 on aggregate over two legs in the major semi-final, before defeating Gold Coast United 1–0 in the Preliminary Final to qualify for the 2011 A-League Grand Final against Brisbane. By reaching the Grand Final, the club also qualified for the 2012 AFC Champions League. In a championship match that the A-League's website called "classic", Central Coast was defeated 4–2 in a penalty shootout after leading 2–0 with three minutes remaining in extra time to finish runners-up for the third time.

The 2011–12 season was similarly successful, as the club won the premiership for the second time in its history with 51 points, two more than second-place Brisbane. The club failed to qualify for a second successive Grand Final, though, losing 5–2 on aggregate to Brisbane in the major semi-final and 5–3 on penalties after a 1–1 draw with Perth Glory in the Grand Final Qualifier.

On 21 April 2013, after three losses in Grand Finals, Central Coast won its first A-League title, defeating first-year side Western Sydney Wanderers 2–0 in the Grand Final at Allianz Stadium. Arnold re-signed with the club for a further two seasons on 30 August 2013, but on 14 November it was confirmed that he had signed a two-year contract to become manager of J. League Division 1 side Vegalta Sendai, starting in January 2014. Former assistant manager Phil Moss was named the new head coach. Mariners general manager Peter Turnbull left the club as well, and New Zealand international Michael McGlinchey moved to the J. League to play for Arnold's new side. Central Coast finished the 2013–14 A-League regular season in third place, behind runner-up Western Sydney on goal difference. In the semi-final, the Mariners' championship hopes ended with a 2–0 loss to Western Sydney; the game came three days after the team was eliminated from the 2014 AFC Champions League after losing to Japanese club Sanfrecce Hiroshima 1–0 to finish last in their group.

In what was Moss's first pre-season as coach, he did little to change what Arnold had built at the club. The only major changes in the side were with the addition of Senegalese international Malick Mané and Hungarian Richárd Vernes, and Marcos Flores leaving the club, with Mile Sterjovski retiring. Mariners began the season on a high, progressing to the semi-finals of the 2014 FFA Cup and defeating local rivals Newcastle Jets 1–0 at home in the opening round of the A-League. However the season soon turned with the team failing to secure a win for the remainder of the year. After their elimination from the 2015 AFC Champions League qualifying play-off by Chinese side Guangzhou R&F and a continued poor league record after a short mid-season break, the club stood down Moss as head coach. The decision was made on 6 March 2015, with Mariners appointing technical director Tony Walmsley in an interim capacity and captain John Hutchinson in a dual player-coach role, until the end of the season. Portuguese player Fábio Ferreira also joined the team at the tail end of the season. On 15 April Walmsley was announced as Mariners' permanent technical director and head coach for the 2015–16 season. The announcement came despite an end to the season in which the club finished the league in eighth position.

Post-Arnold Era (2015–2020)
The Mariners had their equal-worst A-League performance to date in the 2015–16 season. Their 13 points, the fewest in club history, resulted in a last-place finish, and they set a league record by losing 20 games while winning only 3, a record low for the Mariners. Central Coast allowed 70 goals, the most in league history, and had a goal difference of −37, the worst by an A-League team. The Mariners' totals of goals conceded at home and away (32 and 38 respectively) were also A-League records, and they went the entire season without a clean sheet.

In the 2016 FFA Cup, the Mariners suffered a 2–1 loss to Green Gully SC at Green Gully Reserve, becoming just the second A-League team to be eliminated by a state league team in the FFA Cup. Following this loss the club sacked Walmsley on 8 August 2016, with coaching duties in the leadup to the 2016–17 season taken up by assistant coach John Hutchinson in a caretaker role.

On 29 August 2016, Paul Okon was hired as Central Coast's full-time coach, succeeding the sacked Tony Walmsley. In Okon's debut as Central Coast manager, the Mariners drew 3–3 with Perth Glory at Nib Stadium, after coming back from 3–0 down at half time.
Okon achieved his first win as Central Coast manager in his fifth game in charge: a 2–1 win over defending champions Adelaide United at Hindmarsh Stadium on 6 November 2016. However, the Mariners ended the season in eighth.

On 2 August 2017, for the second consecutive year, the Mariners were knocked out of the FFA Cup by a state league team in the first round, after losing 3–2 to Blacktown City. During the 2017–18 A-League season, the Mariners were in the top four at one stage, but after a run of 11 games without a win the club dropped down the table. Okon resigned as manager with Central Coast in ninth entering the last four rounds of the regular season; Wayne O'Sullivan served as an interim manager following Okon's departure. With a six-game losing streak at the end of the season, the team finished last for the second time in three years. Former Brisbane manager Mike Mulvey was hired by Central Coast in 2018. In the first 21 matches of the 2018–19 A-League season, the Mariners won only once. Mulvey was replaced as manager by Alen Stajcic, the former head coach of the Australia women's national team. Despite two wins in his six games as a caretaker manager, the Mariners were unable to avoid finishing at the bottom of the table again. Stajcic was given a three-year contract after the season.

On August 4, 2020, after playing their last game of the 2019-20 season, the Mariners were put up for sale by owner Michael Charlesworth, putting the club at risk of leaving the Central Coast. If no buyer is found, the Mariners' A-League license will be handed back to the FFA.

Resurgence (2020–present)
In his second full season at the club, Stajcic made some large signings, re-acquiring the services of former player Oliver Bozanic on October 21, 2020 after he had left Scottish club Hearts and signing Costa Rican international Marco Urena on December 22, 2020 after he had left South Korean club Gwangju FC. 

The season had begun well with the Mariners beating local rivals Sydney FC in Sydney for the first time in 7 years. In somewhat of a fairy-tale story, the Mariners sat in first place after 16 rounds but would drop points during the later rounds to finish in third place. This qualified the club for their first finals appearance in 7 years. They would then lose to Macarthur FC 2–0 in the elimination finals on 12 June, 2021.

On 17 June 2021, Stajcic decided to resign from the club. His replacement, Nick Montgomery, was announced on July 7, 2021.

Montgomery's first season continued on the success of last season. He brought the club to its first ever FFA Cup Final where they lost 2–1 to Melbourne Victory on 5 February, 2022. The Mariners also finished fifth in the A-League which qualified the club for a second consecutive finals series. They were again knocked out in the elimination finals, this time by Adelaide United, losing 3–1 on 15 May, 2022.

On 10 June, 2022, the club announced that it had retained the services of Montgomery and assistant coach Sergio Raimundo until at least 2025.

Colours and badge
The home jersey worn by the Mariners is mostly yellow with sleeves that are navy blue. The away uniform is a mostly plain navy blue jersey with yellow as a secondary colour. In the 2011–12 season, the club had its kits manufactured by Hummel, as the A-League's Reebok deal had expired at the conclusion of the 2010–11 season. In September 2012, it was announced that the Mariners had signed a two-year deal with Kappa for them to be the official apparel supplier. The team logo is a yellow football at the centre of a blue curling wave, which symbolises the beaches of the Central Coast.

Since 2012, the Mariners have worn special pink kits for one match in October to raise money and awareness for Pink Ribbon Day, part of National Breast Cancer Awareness Month. The Mariners club collected donations at the ground, as well as auctioning the match-worn kits on online auction site eBay with proceeds going to the charity.

Kit Evolution
 Home

Sponsorship

Stadium

Central Coast Mariners plays home games at Central Coast Stadium, Gosford. It is located in Grahame Park, between the Gosford Central Business District and the Brisbane Water foreshore. It is constructed to make the most of its location, being open at the southern end, giving filtered views of Brisbane Water through a row of large palm trees. It is within walking distance of Gosford railway station and is adjacent to the Central Coast Leagues Club.

While the stadium has a capacity of 20,059, the highest attendance for a Mariners game is 19,238 against Newcastle Jets in round 19 of the 2007–08 season. Difficulties in drawing spectators led the Mariners to schedule matches in the 2013–14 and 2014–15 seasons away from Central Coast Stadium, at North Sydney Oval and Brookvale Oval. The club's goal was to play closer to its fan base in north Sydney, which majority owner Michael Charlesworth estimated to be about 20% of its total supporters. Following attendances at North Sydney Oval that were similar to those at Central Coast Stadium, Football Federation Australia CEO David Gallop suggested in December 2014 that it would be unlikely that the club would be permitted to continue playing in north Sydney.

Supporters and rivalries

The active supporters' group for the Mariners is called the Yellow Army, who sit in bay 16 of Central Coast Stadium during home games. In addition to the Yellow Army, there is a Central Coast Mariners Official Supporters Club, which was established during 2013. The Central Coast region has about 300,000 residents, which gives the Mariners the A-League's smallest local fan base. Accordingly, the Mariners acquired a small-market image among commentators.

The Mariners developed a strong rivalry with Newcastle Jets throughout their first season, often referred to as the F3 Derby. The naming is a title previously used for the Sydney–Newcastle Freeway, the major motorway which joins the two clubs' cities. The rivalry's origins date back to before the teams played against each other in the A-League. A May 2005 Oceania Club Championship qualification match, which went to a penalty shootout that the Mariners won, helped create hostility between the sides. In the game, a tackle by Central Coast's Mrdja broke one of Newcastle player Andrew Durante's legs, causing him to miss the following A-League season; Mrdja offered no apology for the tackle, upsetting Jets players. Fans of the clubs battled verbally before and after one 2011 derby match, leading the Newcastle Herald'''s Josh Leeson to call their actions "immature and laughable." In more recent seasons, the F3 Derby has gained less attention in the press than the derbies in Melbourne and Sydney, but Central Coast player Nicholas Fitzgerald maintains that "the players and fans still take it very seriously."

Central Coast also have a rivalry with Sydney FC. Like Newcastle, Sydney FC is close in proximity to Central Coast. In 2006, the Central Coast Express Advocates Richard Noone called the Central Coast–Sydney rivalry "Arguably A-League's fiercest".

Affiliated clubs
Through an investment in the Mariners by Sheffield United the club has the following international affiliations:
  Sheffield United
  São Paulo
  Ferencváros

In addition, the club has a player development partnership with the following international clubs:
  Everton
  Southern
The club previously has formal relationships with the following organisations in Australia:
  Northbridge (as North Shore Mariners Academy 2014-2020)

Players

First-team squad

Youth

 Retired numbers 

 19 –  Matt Simon (forward, 2006–12, 2013–15, 2018–22) 

Club officials

Management

Technical staff

Managers

Records

John Hutchinson currently holds the team record for number of total games played with 271 matches in all competitions. Former captain Matt Simon has the second most appearances for the club with 238 matches. Alex Wilkinson is the third most capped player with 206 appearances. As of 2020, Central Coast's all-time highest goalscorers in all competitions is Matt Simon with 66 goals, twenty-three more than Adam Kwasnik. Daniel McBreen has scored the third most goals for the club with 30. Central Coast's highest attendance at its home stadium, Central Coast Stadium, is 19,238 against Newcastle Jets in their round 19 match of the 2007–08 season. This was the second highest crowd at the ground for any sport since the first match at Central Coast Stadium in February 2000.

Honours

 A-League Men PremiershipWinners (2) : 2007–08, 2011–12
Runners-up (2): 2010–11, 2012–13

 A-League Men Championship Winners (1) : 2013
Runners-up (3): 2006, 2008, 2011

 Australia Cup
Runners-up (1): 2021

 A-League Pre-Season Challenge CupWinners (1) :''' 2005
Runners-Up (1): 2006

The Mariners Medal (Player of the Year)

Team of the decade

See also
 Central Coast Mariners FC (W-League)
 Central Coast Mariners Academy
 List of Central Coast Mariners FC seasons

Notes

References

External links
 
 Central Coast Mariners FC Android application

 
A-League Men teams
Association football clubs established in 2004
2004 establishments in Australia
Soccer clubs on the Central Coast, New South Wales